Attorney General Walton may refer to:

John Lawson Walton (1852–1908), Attorney General for England and Wales
William M. Walton (1832–1915), Attorney General of Texas

See also
General Walton (disambiguation)